Fillmore Towne Theatre is a former vaudeville and movie theater in Fillmore, California and is a landmark in downtown. Built in 1916, the single-screen theater showed silent films.

History
The single-screen theater was used to show silent films and the stage area was used for vaudeville. Mary Pickford performed here.

Built in 1916, the Fillmore Towne Theatre has gone through numerous owners as well as several names. Previously known as Barnes, Stearns, Fillmore, this theater has gone through two fires and an earthquake.

After the 1994 Northridge earthquake, the City of Fillmore purchased the building. Through extensive fund raising by citizens in the Save the Towne Theatre Committee, as well as federal and state grants, such as those given by the State Historic Preservation Office, the theatre was restored. After the restoration (costing in excess of $1 million), it reopened in 1996, showing the latest movies.  The theatre stopped showing feature films in April 2011 as the city budget could no longer make up the shortfall.

In 2021, the theater was purchased by Mudturtle Theatrical, Inc. Mudturtle intends to restore the theater to make it a venue for "building community through the arts".

Structure
This single-screen theater was renovated in 1994, with new seats and carpet, as well as a live stage in order to restore its vaudeville roots.  It has a total of 333 seats on the main floor. The balcony is closed.

References 

Cinemas and movie theaters in California
Fillmore, California
Buildings and structures in Ventura County, California
Theatres in California
Event venues established in 1916
Theatres completed in 1916
1916 establishments in California
Tourist attractions in Ventura County, California